John Howard Van Amringe, also known as the Van Amringe Memorial, is an outdoor bust depicting the American educator and mathematician of the same name, installed at Van Amringe Quadrangle on the Columbia University campus in Upper Manhattan, New York City. It was sculpted by William Ordway Partridge in 1912, and installed on Commencement Day in June 1922.

On June 8, 1962, the bust was toppled off of its pedestal by vandals and received extensive damage. It was repaired or replaced, and reinstalled in December of that year.

References

External links
 

Busts in New York City
Columbia University campus
Monuments and memorials in Manhattan
Outdoor sculptures in Manhattan
Sculptures of men in New York City
Vandalized works of art in New York City